Andrew Roachford  (born 22 January 1965) is a British singer-songwriter and the main force behind the band Roachford, who scored their first success in 1989 with the hits "Cuddly Toy" and "Family Man". He has also had a successful solo career.

He was appointed Member of the Order of the British Empire (MBE) in the 2019 Birthday Honours for services to music.

Early life and career
Andrew Roachford was born in London, England. The band of the same name was formed in 1987, the line-up featuring Andrew Roachford (vocals, keyboards, percussion), Chris Taylor (drums), Hawi Gondwe (guitars) and Derrick Taylor (bass guitar). By 1988, the band were touring, supporting acts such as Terence Trent D'Arby and The Christians. Shortly afterward, a seven-album recording contract with Columbia was signed. They went on to have a string of success throughout the 1990s, becoming Columbia's biggest-selling UK act for ten years.

Roachford released his first solo album, Heart of the Matter, in 2003. His next album Word of Mouth was released in June 2005 under the band name Roachford. In 2010, Roachford joined Mike + The Mechanics along with Tim Howar. The following year the album The Road was released featuring Roachford and Howar as lead vocalists, as well as the 2017 album Let Me Fly.

Roachford collaborated with Beverley Knight on a joint album Twice In a Lifetime, which was released in September 2020. It charted at number 31 on the UK Albums Chart. This was the first Roachford album to chart in the top 40 after a 23-year absence, last charting in 1997 with Feel.

Discography

Albums

Singles

+ "Ain't No Stoppin' Us Now" by MOBO Allstars was a charity single released collectively by MOBO Award nominees in 1998, reaching No. 47 on the UK Singles Chart. The artists featured on the recording were Another Level, Beverley Knight, Mica Paris, Damage, Nine Yards, Don-E, Hinda Hicks, Celetia, Dina Carroll, Dru Hill, Shola Ama, Truce, Misty Oldland, Ultimate Kaos, Kleshay, Lynden David Hall, Kele Le Roc, East 17, Conner Reeves, Des'ree, Cleopatra, Glamma Kid, Honeyz, Kelle Bryan, Roachford, Byron Stingily, Alyson Brown, D'Influence, Michelle Gayle, Ignorants, Soundproof, Tony Dortie, David Grant and Carrie Grant.

References

External links
Roachford official UK site

1965 births
Living people
21st-century Black British male singers
Mike + The Mechanics members
20th-century Black British male singers
Black British rock musicians
CBS Records artists
English people of Barbadian descent
Members of the Order of the British Empire